Alexander Løntoft Baun (born 18 November 1995) is a Danish professional footballer who plays as a right winger for Danish 2nd Division club Aarhus Fremad.

Career

Skive
After having played lower league football in the Jutland Series for FC Skanderborg and Tjørring IF, Baun moved to Skive IK in the second-tier Danish 1st Division in January 2017. There, he impressed during the fall of the 2017–18 season which attracted the interest of Danish Superliga clubs.

Hobro
On 16 September 2017, it was announced that Baun had signed a three-and-a-half year contract with Hobro IK effective from 1 January. He thereby turned fully professional, after having played on a semi-professional contract with Skive.

Baun made his professional debut on 28 February 2018 in a Danish Superliga game against FC Copenhagen. Coming on as a substitute for Edgar Babayan in the 77th minute, Hobro lost 0–2 after goals from Viktor Fischer and Rasmus Falk. This would be his only appearance for the club that season.

He would struggle with a complicated ankle injury the following year, which impacted his playing time significantly. He returned to playing football in February 2020, but again playing time was sparse. As Hobro suffered relegation to the Danish 1st Division in the 2019–20 season, Baun would see his playing time increase. He finished the 2020–21 season with 21 appearances, in which he scored one goal.

Baun left Hobro at the end of the 2020–21 season.

Later career
On 2 April 2022, Baun signed with Danish 2nd Division club Middelfart. He made his debut the same day in a 3–1 loss to Kolding IF. On 31 January 2023, Baun moved to fellow league club Aarhus Fremad.

References

1995 births
Living people
Danish men's footballers
AC Horsens players
Tjørring IF players
Skive IK players
Hobro IK players
Middelfart Boldklub players
Aarhus Fremad players
Association football wingers
Denmark Series players
Danish 2nd Division players
Danish 1st Division players
Danish Superliga players
People from Herning Municipality
Sportspeople from the Central Denmark Region